Leo Cahill (July 30, 1928 – February 15, 2018) was an American head coach and general manager in the Canadian Football League, much of it spent with the Toronto Argonauts.

Early life 
Cahill was born on July 30, 1928, in Utica, Illinois, and later attended the University of Illinois on a football scholarship. He appeared as a player in the 1947 Rose Bowl. 
After leaving college, Cahill served in the United States Army during the Korean War.

Career 
Following his honourable discharge from the U.S. Army, Cahill ascended the coaching ranks through various colleges, including his alma mater.
He began his Canadian Football League career in the 1960s as an assistant coach with the Montreal Alouettes before moving to Toronto with the then Toronto Rifles of the Continental Football League. 
He was appointed head coach of the Toronto Argonauts in 1967, retaining the position until 1972, returning again in the 1977 and 1978 seasons.
He would later serve as General Manager for the team from 1986 to 1988.
In his time with the Argonauts he was credited with bringing in such greats such as Mel Profit, Jim Stillwagon, Jim Corrigall, Leon McQuay and Joe Theismann. Cahill was also the general manager for the Ottawa Rough Riders in 1996; he was the team's last GM in their 120-year history as they folded at the end of the season.

From 2004 onward, Cahill served as goodwill ambassador for the Argonauts. He also served as a colour commentator for CFL telecasts on CBC between 1981 and 1985.
Cahill was inducted into the Ontario Sports Hall of Fame in 2013 in recognition of his contributions to the Argonauts franchise.

Death 
Leo Cahill died at an Atlanta hospital on February 15, 2018, at the age of 89, and is survived by five children: Steve, Christy, Terry, Lisa and Bettye.

References

External links
 CFL.ca profile
 "Tribute to Leo may have ring to it"
 "The toughest fight of Leo Cahill's life"
 "Argos’ legend Cahill has eye on 100th Grey Cup"

1928 births
2018 deaths
United States Army personnel of the Korean War
Canadian Football League announcers
Illinois Fighting Illini football coaches
Illinois Fighting Illini football players
People from North Utica, Illinois
Players of American football from Illinois
Continental Football League coaches
Toronto Argonauts coaches
Toronto Argonauts general managers
Ottawa Rough Riders general managers